Donuca lanipes is a species of moth of the family Noctuidae first described by Arthur Gardiner Butler in 1877. It is found in the north-eastern quarter of Australia.

The wingspan is about 60 mm.

References

Catocalina